Ultra-wideband (UWB, ultra wideband, ultra-wide band and ultraband) is a radio technology that can use a very low energy level for short-range, high-bandwidth communications over a large portion of the radio spectrum. The following is a list of devices that support the technology from various UWB silicon providers.

Smartphones

Smartwatches

IoT devices

References 

Near-field communication
NFC-enabled mobile devices